The numerical multiplier (or multiplying affix) in IUPAC nomenclature indicates how many particular atoms or functional groups are attached at a particular point in a molecule. The affixes are derived from both Latin and Greek.

Compound affixes 
The prefixes are given from the least significant decimal digit up: units, then tens, then hundreds, then thousands. For example:
548 → octa- (8) + tetraconta- (40) + pentacta- (500) = octatetracontapentacta-
9267 → hepta- (7) + hexaconta- (60) + dicta- (200) + nonalia- (9000) = heptahexacontadictanonalia-

The numeral one 
While the use of the affix mono- is rarely necessary in organic chemistry, it is often essential in inorganic chemistry to avoid ambiguity: carbon oxide could refer to either carbon monoxide or carbon dioxide. In forming compound affixes, the numeral one is represented by the term hen- except when it forms part of the number eleven (undeca-): hence
241 → hen- (1) + tetraconta- (40) + dicta- (200) = hentetracontadicta-
411 → undeca- (11) + tetracta- (400) = undecatetracta-

The numeral two 
In compound affixes, the numeral two is represented by do- except when it forms part of the numbers 20 (icosa-), 200 (dicta-) or 2000 (dilia-).

Icosa- v. eicosa- 
IUPAC prefers the spelling icosa- for the affix corresponding to the number twenty on the grounds of etymology. However both the Chemical Abstracts Service and the Beilstein database use the alternative spelling eicosa-.

Other numerical prefix types 
There are two more types of numerical prefixes in IUPAC organic chemistry nomenclature.

Numerical terms for compound or complex features 
Numerical prefixes for multiplication of compound or complex (as in complicated) features are created by adding kis to the basic numerical prefix, with the exception of numbers 2 and 3, which are bis- and tris-, respectively.
 

An example is the IUPAC name for DDT.

Multiplicative prefixes for naming assemblies of identical units 

Examples are biphenyl or terphenyl.

Etymology 
"mono-" is from Greek monos = "alone". "un" = 1 and "nona-" = 9 are from Latin. The others are derived from Greek numbers.

The forms 100 and upwards are not correct Greek. In Ancient Greek, hekaton = 100, diakosioi = 200, triakosioi = 300, etc. The numbers 200-900 would be confused easily with 22 to 29 if they were used in chemistry. khīlioi = 1000, diskhīlioi = 2000, triskhīlioi = 3000, etc., and 13 to 19 are treiskaideka etc. with the Greek for "and"inserted (as in triskaidekaphobia).

Notes and references 
 

Chemical nomenclature